Robert Scott Moncrieff (1 December 1793 – 18 June 1869) was a Scottish advocate, amateur illustrator and caricaturist.

Life
He was born in Tullibole Castle near Fossoway on 1 December 1793.

He trained in law at the University of Edinburgh.

Most of his cartoons are of his legal peers and are clearly drawn during court proceedings. Many of his illustrations from the years 1816 to 1820 were included in the 1871 publication The Scottish Bar Fifty Years Ago: Sketches of Scott and His Contemporaries.

From around 1830 he served as Chamberlain to the Duke of Buccleuch at Dalkeith Palace.

He died in Edinburgh on 18 June 1869. He is buried with other members of the Scott Moncrieff family at the south end of the sealed south-west section of Greyfriars Kirkyard commonly called the Covenanter's Prison.

Family
He was married to Susan Pringle (1796–1840) around 1820. They had 11 children several of whom rose to some fame. Susan died soon after the birth of the 11th child. Few of the children lived long lives.
Elizabeth (1821–1848) died in India
Susan (1824–1852) died in Edinburgh, buried in Dean Cemetery
Alexander Pringle Scott Moncrieff (1827–1865) Major in the Indian Army, died in Benares. Married Elizabeth Coventry daughter of Rev George Coventry and they were parents to Sir George Scott-Moncrieff
Sir Colin Campbell Scott Moncrieff (1836–1916), Director of Irrigation in Egypt and Under Secretary of State for Scotland, died in Chelsea, London
Rev John Edward Scott Moncrieff (1839–1860), died in Batavia
Charles the youngest son (1840–1859)
Joanna Scott-Moncrieff
 , (fl. 1862), painted an album of watercolours, which she dedicated to her father

He married his second wife, Mary Elizabeth Hamilton (1811–1885), considerably his junior, around 1845.

Their infant daughter, Jane Anne, died in 1852.

Gallery

References

Citations

Sources

External links
 
 

1793 births
1869 deaths
18th-century Scottish people
19th-century Scottish people
Members of the Faculty of Advocates
Scottish illustrators
Scottish caricaturists
Alumni of the University of Edinburgh
Burials at Greyfriars Kirkyard